The Kamuflirovannyy Letniy Maskirovochnyy Kombinezon or KLMK is a military uniform with a camouflage pattern developed in 1968 by the Soviet Union to overcome the widespread use of night vision optics and devices by NATO countries. This one-piece camouflage suit became one of the most widely used in the Soviet Union.

, the KLMK was being produced.

History
The KLMK was issued to KGB Border Guards in service dress uniforms. It was later seen with their forces sent to Afghanistan during the Soviet–Afghan War.

Design
The KLMK is made with a digitalized spatter-like pattern.

Variants

KZS Suit
The KZS (kostium zashchitnoi seti or protective net suit) Suit is a two-piece camouflage suit, designed for use by chemical troops. Made of coarse loose weave cotton fabric. It was first issued to Soviet chemical troops in 1975 and was later widely used by troops from all combat arms, especially during the Afghan war.

The KZS was made to be disposable once it cannot be used any longer.

It is also known as the Berezka or Color 57.

Users

 
 
 : KLMK and KZS-type camos used by Belarusian special forces. KZS camos used by Belarusian border guard forces in public appearances.
 
 : Berezhka-based patterns used by Tajik Border Guard.

Former
 : Used by paratroopers.
 : Known to be used by the KGB Border Guards and the VDV.
 : Seen with KLMK pattern-based camos.

Partially-recognized states
 : Used by pro-Russian irregulars during the 2008 Russian-Georgian War.

References

Citations

Works cited
 
 
 
 
 

Military camouflage
Soviet military uniforms
Military equipment introduced in the 1960s